Rahmah Pinky (born Nanyanzi Rahmah on July 12, 2004) is a Ugandan musician from Team No Sleep (TNS). She was signed to replace Sheebah Karungi, who quit the record label.

Life and career 
Pinky was born in Kawempe, a division of Kampala, the capital of Uganda. She attended Lugoba Parents Nursery & Primary School, which is located in the Kazo-Angola parish with the Kawempe Division. She was admitted to Kibibi Moslem Senior Secondary School for her O-Level. She later joined London College School, located in Nansana Town, for her A-Level education. She is currently studying at the International University of East Africa.

She started dabbling in music in her primary classes and was the choir leader. Her professional music career started in 2019 with her first song Tukooye, which was recorded at Badman Records. She sings inspirational and advocacy songs, and her most famous song being Superstar Wankuba.

Singles 
 Superstar
 Tukooye 
 Girl child
 Omuzaade with Fresh Kid
 Maanyi 
 Kyekyo
 Selector
 Ku kwagala
 Onyuma Okulaba
 Walwawo

References 

21st-century Ugandan women singers
2004 births
Living people